Thomas Nitzsche (born 1 December 1975 in Zeulenroda) is a German politician (FDP) and the Mayor of Jena since 1 July 2018.

Career 
Nitzsche attended the Hubert Westhoff Polytechnic High School in Zeulenroda from 1982 to 1991 and the Carl-Zeiss-Gymnasium in Jena from 1991 until achieving his Abitur in 1994. In 1995 he began studies in English and political science at the Friedrich Schiller University of Jena. He remained in Jena until graduation apart from a year in Glasgow and a quarter-term in Salamanca.  While at FSU Jena, Nitzsche was a research assistant to Klaus Dicke, later Rector of the university. For his graduate thesis in 2007 he wrote about the Spanish liberal politician Salvador de Madariaga. From 2008 until he took office as mayor, Nitzsche was a subject specialist (Fachreferent) at the Thuringian University and State Library (ThULB).

Politics 

In 2003, Nitzsche became district chairman for the Young Liberals in Jena and in 2007, he became district chairman for the FDP. Since 2009, he earned a place on the city council of Jena. In the 2012 Thuringian municipal elections, he ran for the position of Mayor of Jena for the first time and received 2.4% of the vote. In the 2013 German federal election, he ran for the FDP in the constituency Gera - Jena - Saale-Holzland-Kreis.  Nitzsche is presently the acting chairman of the FDP Thuringia.  In the city council of Jena, he was chairman of committees on youth welfare and school development and of the kindergarten sub-committee. Until his election, he also headed the advisory board for motor vehicle traffic in Jena and was a knowledgeable citizen member of the Urban Development Committee. 

In the 2018 Thuringian municipal elections, Nitzsche ran a successful campaign as the FDP candidate for the position of Mayor of Jena.  In the first ballot on 15 April 2018, he received at 26.9% the most votes of any of the nine candidates. In particular, he outperformed the incumbent mayor Albrecht Schröter, a result which was considered surprising to most observers.
In the subsequent runoff ballot of 29 April 2018, Nitzsche defeated Schröter with 63.3% of the vote.

Personal 
Nitzsche has been married since 1998 and has a daughter and a son.

Publications 
 Thomas Nitzsche: Salvador de Madariaga: Liberaler – Spanier – Weltbürger. Der Weg eines politischen Intellektuellen durch das Europa des 20. Jahrhunderts. Univ.-Diss., Jena 2007 (in German).

External links 

 Mayoral website of Thomas Nitzsche
Official profile from the City of Jena

References

References

1975 births
Free Democratic Party (Germany) politicians
Mayors of Jena
Living people